Bulgan Airport  is a public airport located in Bulgan, the capital of Bulgan Province in Mongolia. It has one grass runway, 13/31.

See also 
 List of airports in Mongolia

References

External links 
World Airport codes Bulgan airport

Airports in Mongolia